Saving Shiloh is a 2006 American family drama film directed by Sandy Tung, based on the book of the same name written by Phyllis Reynolds Naylor. It is the third and final film in the trilogy, whose other members are Shiloh and Shiloh Season.

Plot
The movie begins with Marty Preston (Jason Dolley) explaining the events of Shiloh and Shiloh 2: Shiloh Season. Then Judd Travers (Scott Wilson) shows up at the Preston home with dead squirrels as a present for Marty and his family for helping him after his truck accident in the second film. A fearful Shiloh runs into the kitchen since he is still scared of Judd. Marty's sister, Becky (Liberty Smith), embarrasses her mother, Lou (Ann Dowd) when she calls Judd the meanest man since Judd says he has eaten dead squirrels all his life. Soon, Marty hears from his two best friends, David Howard (Jordan Garrett) and Sam Wallace (Taylor Momsen), that after a fist fight, a drunken Judd has been charged with murder. Marty brings Judd some squirrel stew and offers to help Judd, believing that he hasn't committed murder. Soon after, when Marty is helping Judd build a fence for his hunting dogs, Judd accidentally steps on one of his dog's paws. The dog starts attacking Judd, biting his good leg. Judd doesn't show any fear, grabbing the dog and swinging him at a fence. Afterward, when Dara Lynn (Kyle Chavarria), another of Marty's sisters, falls into a lake, Marty jumps in to save her. Shiloh jumps in to help but gets caught in the current, which leads toward Miller Falls. Marty goes back into the lake to save Shiloh but gets caught in a branch. Seeing this, Judd jumps off a cliff into the lake to free Marty. Marty explains to Judd that Shiloh is going to go over the waterfall unless he saves him. Judd saves Shiloh and begins a friendship with Marty and Shiloh. Judd joins the local fire and rescue department after his acts of bravery. The film ends with Marty saying, "If you open your heart, anything is possible".

Cast
 Jason Dolley as Martin "Marty" Preston
 Jordan Garrett as David Howard
 Taylor Momsen as Samantha "Sam" Wallace
 Scott Wilson as Judd Travers 
 Ann Dowd as Louise "Lou" Preston
 Gerald McRaney as Raymond "Ray" Preston
 Liberty Smith as Rebecca "Becky" Preston
 Kyle Chavarria as Dara Lynn Preston

Reception
While Richard Roeper said that he felt as if he "were being preached to throughout this film", Roger Ebert says that it is a "family film that deals with real problems and teaches real values, and yet is exciting and entertaining". It has a rating of 36% on Rotten Tomatoes.

References

External links
 
 

2006 films
Films about dogs
Warner Bros. films
American children's drama films
Films based on children's books
Films about pets
Mark Twain Awards
2000s English-language films
2000s American films